Ken Englund (May 6, 1914 – August 10, 1993) was an American screenwriter. He wrote the films The Big Broadcast of 1938, Artists and Models Abroad, There's That Woman Again, Good Girls Go to Paris, Slightly Honorable, The Doctor Takes a Wife, No, No, Nanette, This Thing Called Love, Nothing but the Truth, Rings on Her Fingers, Springtime in the Rockies, Sweet Rosie O'Grady, Here Come the Waves, The Unseen, The Secret Life of Walter Mitty, Good Sam, A Millionaire for Christy, Androcles and the Lion, Never Wave at a WAC, The Vagabond King and The Wicked Dreams of Paula Schultz.

He died on August 10, 1993, in Woodland Hills, Los Angeles, California at age 79.

References

External links
 

1914 births
1993 deaths
American male screenwriters
20th-century American male writers
20th-century American screenwriters